Baranki is a village in Poland.

Baraanki may also refer to:
, a village in Belarus
, a type of sweet bread in East Slavic cuisine; see Bublik